The 2004 IIHF World U18 Championship Division I was a pair of international under-18 ice hockey tournaments run by the International Ice Hockey Federation. The Division I tournaments made up the second level of competition at the 2004 IIHF World U18 Championships. The Group A tournament took place between 27 March and 2 April 2004 in Amstetten, Austria and the Group B tournament took place between 29 March and 4 April 2004 in Asiago, Italy. Switzerland and Germany won the Group A and Group B tournaments respectively and gained promotion to the Championship Division for the 2005 IIHF World U18 Championships. While Romania finished last in Group A and South Korea last in Group B and were both relegated to Division II for 2005.

Group A tournament
The Group A tournament began on 27 March 2004 in Amstetten, Austria. Austria, Latvia, Poland and Slovenia all returned to compete in this year's Division I tournament after missing promotion to the Championship Division at the previous years World Championships. Romania gained promotion to Division I after finishing first in lasts years Division II tournament and Switzerland was relegated from the Championship Division after failing to survive the relegation round at the 2003 IIHF World U18 Championship.

Switzerland won the tournament after winning all five of their games, finishing first in the group standings and gained promotion to the Championship Division for the 2005 IIHF World U18 Championships. Slovenia finished in second place and Austria finished third after only losing to Switzerland and Slovenia. Romania finished in last place, managing only to tie one game and lose the other four and were relegated back to Division II for the 2005 IIHF World U18 Championships. Rafael Rotter of Austria finished as the top scorer of the tournament with eleven points including five goals and six assists. Latvia's Kristaps Stigis finished as the tournaments leading goaltender with a save percentage of 92.93.

Standings

Fixtures
All times local.

Scoring leaders

List shows the top ten skaters sorted by points, then goals.

Leading goaltenders
Only the top five goaltenders, based on save percentage, who have played 40% of their team's minutes are included in this list.

Group B tournament
The Group B tournament began on 29 March 2004 in Asiago, Italy. France, Germany, Italy and Japan all returned to compete in this year's Division I tournament after missing promotion to the Championship Division at the previous years World Championships. South Korea gained promotion to Division I after finishing first in lasts years Division II tournament and Kazakhstan was relegated from the Championship Division after failing to survive the relegation round at the 2003 IIHF World U18 Championship.

Germany won the tournament after winning all five of their games, finishing first in the group standings and gained promotion to the Championship Division for the 2005 IIHF World U18 Championships. Japan finished second after losing only to Germany and Italy finished in third place. South Korea finished in last place, managing only to tie one game and lose the other four and were relegated back to Division II for the 2005 IIHF World U18 Championships. Daniel Pietta of Germany finished as the top scorer of the tournament with eleven points including eight goals and three assists. Japan's Yuto Takashima finished as the tournaments leading goaltender with a save percentage of 96.59.

Standings

Fixtures
All times local.

Scoring leaders

List shows the top ten skaters sorted by points, then goals.

Leading goaltenders
Only the top five goaltenders, based on save percentage, who have played 40% of their team's minutes are included in this list.

References

IIHF World U18 Championship Division I
IIHF World U18 Championship Division I
I
International ice hockey competitions hosted by Austria
International ice hockey competitions hosted by Italy
IIHF World U18 Championship Division I